Lexington, Kentucky, held nonpartisan elections for mayor and city council on November 4, 2014. The primary election in Lexington took place on May 20th, 2014 and the deadline for candidates wishing to run in this election had to file for candidacy before January 28th, 2014. Urban development and crime were major issues that were brought up in the election that shaped the 2014 election cycle. It saw the reelection of Jim Gray.

Jim Gray defeats Anthany Beatty to win second term. He is also the first Lexington mayor in sixteen years to win a second term. The night Jim Gray won he gave a speech at his election party at Belle's Cocktail House in Lexington, Kentucky, telling his supporters that he was grateful for Lexington's strong support. Gray ran television ads in late September and ran more of his election campaign ads right before the election. Gray in 2010 was the first openly gay man to be elected mayor making history.

References 
Footnotes

Sources

Mayoral elections in Lexington, Kentucky
Lexington, Kentucky